The Man Who Came Back is a 1931 American Pre-Code drama film directed by Raoul Walsh, starring Janet Gaynor and Charles Farrell. The movie was adapted to screen by Edwin J. Burke from the play by Jules Eckert Goodman.

A Fox property for many years, it had been filmed before in the silent era in 1924 with George O'Brien and Dorothy Mackaill in the leads. A Spanish-language version called Road of Hell was made in the same year.

Gaynor and Farrell made almost a dozen films together, including Frank Borzage's classics Seventh Heaven (1927), Street Angel (1928), and Lucky Star (1929); Gaynor won the first Academy Award for Best Actress for the first two and F. W. Murnau's Sunrise: A Song of Two Humans (1927).

Cast
Janet Gaynor as Angie Randolph
Charles Farrell as Stephen Randolph
Kenneth MacKenna as Captain Trevelyan
William Holden as Thomas Randolph
Mary Forbes as Mrs. Gaynes
Ullrich Haupt as Charles Reisling
William Worthington as Captain Gallon
Peter Gawthorne as Griggs
Leslie Fenton as Baron le Duc

References

External links

1931 films
Films directed by Raoul Walsh
1931 drama films
American drama films
American films based on plays
American black-and-white films
Fox Film films
1930s English-language films
1930s American films